Karl Bengt Johansson (4 January 1926 – 9 April 2008) was a Swedish flyweight wrestler. As a Greco-Roman wrestler he won a world title in 1950 and finished fifth at the 1952 Summer Olympics. In  freestyle wrestling he won two bronze medals, at the 1949 European and 1951 world championships.

References

External links
 

1926 births
2008 deaths
Olympic wrestlers of Sweden
Wrestlers at the 1952 Summer Olympics
Wrestlers at the 1956 Summer Olympics
Swedish male sport wrestlers
World Wrestling Championships medalists
European Wrestling Championships medalists